Leo Njengo (born 16 August 1994) is a Belgian professional footballer who is currently playing for Lokeren-Temse in the Belgian Division 2.

References 

1994 births
Living people
Belgian footballers
Association football midfielders
Belgian expatriate footballers
K.R.C. Genk players
Associação Naval 1º de Maio players
C.D. Trofense players
K.V.C. Westerlo players
K.F.C. Dessel Sport players
Oud-Heverlee Leuven players
K.S.K. Heist players
Royal Cappellen F.C. players
FC Slavia Mozyr players
Challenger Pro League players
Expatriate footballers in Portugal
Expatriate footballers in Belarus
Belgian expatriates in Portugal